Drănic is a commune in Dolj County, Oltenia, Romania with a population of 3,007 people. It is composed of four villages: Booveni, Drănic, Foișor and Padea.

Natives
 
 Ionel Gane

References

Communes in Dolj County
Localities in Oltenia